Mohd Asraff Hayqal bin Zainal (born 23 August 1997) is a Malaysian professional footballer who plays for Malaysia Super League side UiTM as a midfielder.

References

External links
 

1997 births
Living people
Malaysian footballers
UiTM FC players
Malaysia Super League players
Malaysia Premier League players
Association football midfielders